Amissah Anfoh Assan (born 3 June 1995) is a Ghanaian footballer who plays for Elmina Sharks He is a midfielder who often been touted as a box to box midfielder for his ability to exert energy in supporting defensive and offensive play and for his tough tacking style. Assan can also play as a defender, both on the right of defense and in the centre.

Early life
Born in Accra to Mercy Dadzie and Anfoh Assan, Assan attended Kaneshie West 2 JSS. He began his football career after graduating from T.I Ahmadiyya Secondary School in Gomoa Postin, Assan play at a local club called Windy Professionals which is formally known as National Sports College.

Elmina Sharks
On March 28, 2020, it was announced that Amissah Anfoh Assan joined Ghanaian Premier League club Elmina Sharks.

References

External links 
Official Website

1995 births
Living people
Footballers from Accra
Ghanaian footballers
Ghanaian expatriate footballers
Amanat Baghdad players
Haras El Hodoud SC players
Association football midfielders
Expatriate footballers in Egypt
Expatriate footballers in Iraq
Ghanaian expatriate sportspeople in Egypt
Ghanaian expatriates in Iraq
Al-Kahrabaa FC players
Elmina Sharks F.C. players
Windy Professionals FC players